The following is a list of county roads in Union County, Florida.  All county roads are maintained by the county in which they reside.

County roads in Union County

References

FDOT Map of Union County, Florida
FDOT GIS data, accessed January 2014

 
County